Emillio Kathuli is a Kenyan politician. He belongs to the Democratic Party and was elected to represent the Manyatta Constituency in the National Assembly of Kenya since the 2007 Kenyan parliamentary election.

References

Living people
Year of birth missing (living people)
Democratic Party (Kenya) politicians
Members of the National Assembly (Kenya)